Enemy at the Gates: The Battle for Stalingrad is a book written by William Craig and published in 1973 by Reader's Digest Press and in 1974 by Penguin Publishing. The 2001 film Enemy at the Gates utilized the book's title and used it as one of its sources, but was not a direct adaptation of the work.

Reception 
The Slavic Review panned Enemy at the Gates, calling it "rambling and exaggerated" and negatively comparing Craig to former Nazi propagandist and author  Paul Carell. In contrast, The Washington Post was more favorable and drew favorable comparisons to Cornelius Ryan.

References 

1974 non-fiction books
Non-fiction books adapted into films
Works about the Battle of Stalingrad